This article displays the rosters for the participating teams at the 1992 Tournament of the Americas played in Portland, Oregon, United States from June 27 to July 5, 1992.

Group A

Argentina

4 Luis Villar
5 Héctor Campana
6 Fabián Tourn
7 Esteban de la Fuente
8 Hernán Montenegro
9 Marcelo Milanesio
10 Juan Espil
11 Miguel Cortijo
12 Sebastián Uranga
13 Rubén Scolari
14 Esteban Pérez
15 Diego Osella
Head coach:  Walter Garrone

Canada

4 Trevor Williams
5 Ronn McMahon
6 J. D. Jackson
7 David Turcotte
8 Al Kristmanson
9 Leo Rautins
10 Bill Wennington
11 Martin Keane
12 Mike Smrek
13 Greg Wiltjer
14 Phil Ohl
15 Gerald Kazanowski
Head coach:  Ken Shields

Cuba

4 Ángel Caballero
5 Yudi Abreu
6 Félix Morales
7 Lázaro Negrin
8 José Luis Díaz
9 Eliécer Rojas
10 Leonardo Pérez
11 Lazaro Borrell
12 Alberto Maturell
13 Juan Caballero
14 Richard Matienzo
15 Andrés Guibert
Head coach:  Miguel Calderón Gómez

Panama

4 Enrique Grenald
5 Eddy Chávez
6 Reggie Grenald
7 Ricardo Chávez
8 Guillermo Myers
9 Leroy Jackson
10 Mario Gálvez
11 Rolando Frazer
12 Ricardo Grant
13 Carlos Rockshead
14 Stuart Gray
15 Mario Butler
Head coach:  Jim Baron

United States

4 Christian Laettner
5 David Robinson
6 Patrick Ewing
7 Larry Bird
8 Scottie Pippen
9 Michael Jordan
10 Clyde Drexler
11 Karl Malone
12 John Stockton
13 Chris Mullin
14 Charles Barkley
15 Magic Johnson
Head coach:  Chuck Daly

Group B

Brazil

4 Paulinho
5 Guerrinha
6 Gerson
7 Pipoka
8 Rolando
9 Cadum
10 Maury
11 Marcel
12 Josuel
13 Minuci
14 Oscar
15 Israel
Head coach:  José Medalha

Mexico

4 Óscar Castellanos
5 Antonio Reyes
6 Erick Martínez
7 Roberto González
8 Enrique González
9 Rafael Willis
10 Alberto Martínez
11 Luis López
12 Arturo Sánchez
13 José Luis Arroyos
14 Octavio Robles
15 Arturo Montes
Head coach:  Arturo Guerrero

Puerto Rico

4 José Ortiz
5 Federico López
6 Raymond Gause
7 Edwin Pellot
8 Jerome Mincy
9 James Carter
10 Javier Antonio Colón
11 Ramón Rivas
12 Mario Morales
13 Edgar de León
14 Eddie Casiano
15 Richard Soto
Head coach:  Raymond Dalmau

Uruguay

4 Horacio López
5 Luis Larrosa
6 Luis Pierri
7 Hébert Núñez
8 Alain Mayor
9 Horacio Perdomo
10 Marcelo Capalbo
11 Álvaro Tito
12 Gustavo Szczygielski
13 Adolfo Medrick
14 Enrique Tucuna
15 Marcelo Sánchez
Head coach:  Víctor Hugo Berardi

Venezuela

4 Víctor David Díaz
5 David Díaz
6 Melquíades Jaramillo
7 Nelson Solórzano
8 Rostyn González
9 Luis Jiménez
10 Sam Shepherd
11 Carl Herrera
12 Armando Palacios
13 Gabriel Estaba
14 Iván Olivares
15 Alexander Nelcha
Head coach:  Julio Toro

Bibliography

External links
1992 FIBA Americas Championship for Men at fiba.basketball

FIBA AmeriCup squads